Salto Partido is a partido of Buenos Aires Province in Argentina.

Settlements

 Arroyo Dulce
 Inés Indart
 Salto
 Gahan
 Berdier
 La Invencible
 Monroe
 Coronel Isleño

External links
  federal site (Spanish)
 provincial site (Spanish)

 
1864 establishments in Argentina
Partidos of Buenos Aires Province